Edward T. Green (1837 – October 10, 1896) was a United States district judge of the United States District Court for the District of New Jersey.

Education and career

Born in 1837, in Trenton, New Jersey, Green graduated from Princeton University in 1854 and read law to enter the bar in 1858. He also received a Bachelor of Laws from Harvard Law School in 1858. He was in private practice in Trenton from 1858 to 1889, interrupted by service as a Sergeant in the United States Army during the American Civil War.

Federal judicial service

Green received a recess appointment from President Benjamin Harrison on October 24, 1889, to a seat on the United States District Court for the District of New Jersey vacated by Judge John T. Nixon. He was nominated to the same position by President Harrison on December 16, 1889. He was confirmed by the United States Senate on January 27, 1890, and received his commission the same day. His service terminated on October 10, 1896, due to his death in Trenton.

Note

References

Sources
 

1837 births
1896 deaths
Princeton University alumni
Harvard Law School alumni
Judges of the United States District Court for the District of New Jersey
United States federal judges appointed by Benjamin Harrison
19th-century American judges
United States Army soldiers
19th-century American politicians
United States federal judges admitted to the practice of law by reading law
Date of birth unknown